The  is a skyscraper located in Island City, Fukuoka, Fukuoka Prefecture, Japan. Construction of the 145-metre, 42-storey skyscraper was finished in 2008.

External links
  

Buildings and structures completed in 2008
Buildings and structures in Fukuoka
Skyscrapers in Japan
Buildings and structures in Fukuoka Prefecture
2008 establishments in Japan